The Jetta VS5 is a compact crossover SUV jointly developed by FAW Group and Volkswagen Group for its China-exclusive brand, Jetta, and mainly manufactured by FAW-Volkswagen, a joint venture between the two companies since 2019.

Overview
The Jetta VS5 was revealed at the Auto Shanghai, coinciding with the launch of the Jetta brand, a youth-focused brand for China named after the ever-popular sedan sold in China, the Volkswagen Jetta. It was released to the market at the 2019 Chengdu Motor Show as the first of two SUVs from the Jetta brand. The VS5 shares the same platform and body panels with the SEAT Ateca, Volkswagen Tharu and Škoda Karoq.

At the moment, the Jetta VS5 is exclusive to the Chinese market, with no plans for it to be sold elsewhere. It uses the EA211 engine, a 1.4-litre turbocharged inline four-cylinder making 150 PS (148 hp) and 250 Nm (184 lb ft) of torque.

Sales

References

External links 

 Official website

Cars introduced in 2019
Crossover sport utility vehicles
Cars of China
Front-wheel-drive vehicles
2020s cars